The Lepidoptera of Qatar consist of both the butterflies and moths recorded from Qatar. Together they constitute a significant part of the list of arthropods of Qatar.

According to a recent estimate, there are about 34 Lepidoptera species in Qatar.

Butterflies

Hesperiidae

Gegenes nostradamus (Fabricius, 1793)
Pelopidas thrax (Hübner, 1821)

Lycaenidae
Azanus ubaldus (Stoll, 1782)
Brephidium exilis (Boisduval, 1852)
Lampides boeticus (Linnaeus, 1767)
Tarucus balkanicus (Freyer, 1885)
Tarucus rosacea (Austaut, 1885)
Zizeeria karsandra (Moore, 1865)
Zizeeria knysna (Trimen, 1862)

Nymphalidae
Danaus chrysippus chrysippus (Linnaeus, 1758)
Junonia orithya (Linnaeus, 1758)
Vanessa cardui (Linnaeus, 1758)

Papilionidae
Papilio demoleus demoleus Linnaeus, 1758

Pieridae
Belenois aurota (Fabricius, 1793)
Colias croceus (Geoffroy, 1785)
Colotis fausta (Olivier, 1804)
Colotis phisadia (Godart, 1819)
Pieris rapae (Linnaeus, 1758)
Pontia glauconome (Klug, 1829)

Moths

Crambidae
Cornifrons ulceratalis Lederer, 1858
Euchromius ocellea (Haworth, 1811)
Herpetogramma licarsisalis (Walker, 1859)
Nomophila noctuella (Denis & Schiffermüller, 1775)
Pyrausta phaenicealis (Hübner, 1818)
Spoladea recurvalis (Fabricius, 1775)

Cossidae
Eremocossus vaulogeri (Staudinger, 1897)
Holcocerus gloriosus (Erschoff, 1874)

Erebidae
Clytie haifae (Habich, 1905)
Lygephila exsiccata Lederer, 1855
Mocis frugalis (Fabricius, 1775)
Utetheisa pulchella (Linnaeus, 1758)

Geometridae
Scopula coenosaria Lederer 1855
Scopula minorata ochroleucaria (Herrich-Schäffer, 1851)
Rhodometra sacraria Linnaeus, 1767

Lasiocampidae
Streblote siva (Lefèbvre, 1827)

Noctuidae
Agrotis ipsilon (Hufnagel, 1766)
Autographa gamma (Linnaeus, 1758)
Cornutiplusia circumflexa Linnaeus, 1767
Helicoverpa zea (Boddie, 1850)
Heliothis peltigera (Denis & Schiffermüller, 1775)
Spodoptera exigua (Hübner, 1808)
Spodoptera littoralis Boisduval, 1833
Trichoplusia ni (Hübner, 1800-1803)

Sphingidae
Acherontia atropos (Linnaeus, 1758)
Acherontia styx (Westwood, 1847)
Agrius convolvuli (Linnaeus, 1758)
Daphnis nerii (Linnaeus, 1758)
Hippotion celerio (Linnaeus, 1758)
Hyles lineata (Fabricius, 1775)

References
A Preliminary List of the Insect Fauna of Qatar
Qatar Insects Project

Lists of butterflies by location
Lists of moths by country
lepidoptera
Lepidoptera by country

lepidoptera